The following is a list of mayors of the city of Cuiabá, in the state of Mato Grosso, Brazil.

 Amarilio Alves de Almeida, 1909-1910 
 Avelino de Siqueira, 1910-1911		
 Manoel Escolástico Virgínio de Almeida, 1911-1914
 Alexandre Magno Addor, 1914-1920 	
 Antônio Manoel Moreira, 1920-1924	
 José Antônio S. Albuquerque, 1924-1927	
 , 1927-1930
 , 1930-1932
 , 1932-1934	
 Benjamim Duarte Monteiro, 1934-1937
 Álvaro Pinto de Oliveira, 1937-1938
 Isaac Povoas, 1938-1941
 Manoel Miraglia, 1941-1946
 Aquiles Verlangiere, 1946-1947
 Leonel Hugney, 1947-1951
 Manoel Soares de Campos, 1951
 Delphino Santana Rocha de Mattos, 1951-1952
 Manoel José de Arruda, 1952-1955	
 , 1955-1959	
 Hélio Palma de Arruda, 1959-1961	
 Aecím Tocantins, 1961-1962	
 , 1962-1966
 Frederico Campos, 1966-1969, 1989-1992		
 Bento Machado Lobo, 1969-1971	
 Benedito Alves Ferraz, 1971	
 José Vilanova Torres, 1971-1975	
 Giungihglio Luiggi Bello, 1975	
 , 1975-1979	
 Gustavo Arruda, 1979-1983 
 Anildo Lima Barros, 1983-1985	
 Wilson Araújo Coutinho, 1985-1986	
 , 1986, 1987-1989, 1993-1994 
 , 1986-1987 
 José Meirelles, 1994-1997 
 , 1997-2004 
 , 2005-2010 
 , 2010-2012 
 Mauro Mendes, 2013-2016 
 , 2017-

See also
  (city council)
  
 
 Cuiabá history
 Mato Grosso history (state)
  (state)
 List of mayors of largest cities in Brazil (in Portuguese)
 List of mayors of capitals of Brazil (in Portuguese)

References

This article incorporates information from the Portuguese Wikipedia.

Cuiaba